Three regiments of the British Army have been numbered the 58th Regiment of Foot:

 47th (Lancashire) Regiment of Foot, 58th Regiment of Foot, numbered as the 58th Foot in 1747 and renumbered as the 47th in 1751
 56th (West Essex) Regiment of Foot, 58th Regiment of Foot, raised in 1755 and renumbered as the 56th in 1756
 58th (Rutlandshire) Regiment of Foot, raised as the 60th and renumbered as the 58th in 1756

See also

 58th Regiment (disambiguation)